German submarine U-1164 was a Type VIIC/41 U-boat of Nazi Germany's Kriegsmarine during World War II.

She was ordered on 14 October 1941, and was laid down on 11 December 1942, at Danziger Werft AG, Danzig, as yard number 136. She was launched on 3 July 1943, and commissioned under the command of Kapitänleutnant Fokko Schlömer on 27 October 1943.

Design
German Type VIIC/41 submarines were preceded by the heavier Type VIIC submarines. U-1164 had a displacement of  when at the surface and  while submerged. She had two shafts and two  propellers.

U-1164 was fitted with five  torpedo tubes (four fitted at the bow and one at the stern), fourteen torpedoes or 26 TMA or TMB Naval mines, one  SK C/35 naval gun, (220 rounds), one  Flak M42 and two  C/30 anti-aircraft guns. The boat had a complement of between forty-four and fifty-two.

Service history
On 24 July 1944, U-1164 was sunk during a British air raid on the Deutsche Werke shipyard in Kiel. She was later raised and decommissioned before being broken up.

See also
 Battle of the Atlantic

References

Bibliography

German Type VIIC/41 submarines
U-boats commissioned in 1943
World War II submarines of Germany
1943 ships
Ships built in Danzig
Maritime incidents in July 1944
U-boats sunk by British aircraft